Dicya is a genus of butterflies in the family Lycaenidae. The species of this genus are found in the Neotropical realm.

Species
Dicya dicaea (Hewitson, 1874) Brazil, Paraguay 
Dicya carnica (Hewitson, 1873) Mexico to Brazil (Amazonas), Bolivia
Dicya iambe (Godman & Salvin, [1887]) Costa Rica, Bolivia, Ecuador
Dicya eumorpha (Hayward, 1949) Argentina
Dicya lucagus (Godman & Salvin, [1887]) Mexico
Dicya lollia (Godman & Salvin, [1887]) Guatemala, Costa Rica

References

Eumaeini
Lycaenidae of South America
Lycaenidae genera